Lists of First Nations cover the First Nations of Canada, the predominant indigenous peoples in Canada south of the Arctic Circle. The lists include:

List of First Nations band governments, a list, by province or territory, of the various First Nations government bodies in Canada
List of First Nations peoples, a list, by geographical area, of the various First Nations tribes in Canada
List of First Nations people, an alphabetical list of people who are members of the First Nations in Canada